The Best of the Classic Years is a compilation album by Nigerian musician King Sunny Adé.  It was released by Shanachie in 2003. The album showcases Adé's rawer pre-Island Records sound.

Background
The compilation compiles material recorded between 1969 and 1974 for the Nigerian market. The 1974 hit "Synchro System" was later re-recorded by Adé for his 1983 album of the same name.

The album was compiled by Randall Grass.

Critical reception
The New Rolling Stone Album Guide called the compilation's music "an engrossing dream of interlocked beats, pealing guitars, and sweet voices." In his review of the album, Robert Christgau called Adé "a titan, one of the great pop musicians of the 20th century." He listed The Best of the Classic Years as the best album of 2003. AllMusic called it "the perfect place to start" with Adé's work. In 2020, the album was ranked number 465 in the 500 Greatest Albums of All Time by Rolling Stone.

Track listing

References

King Sunny Adé albums
2003 compilation albums
Shanachie Records compilation albums